The 1982 Volvo Grand Prix was a professional tennis circuit held that year. It incorporated the four grand slam tournaments, the Grand Prix tournaments. The circuit was administered by the Men's International Professional Tennis Council (MIPTC). On 30 April 1981 World Championship Tennis (WCT) announced its withdrawal from the Grand Prix circuit, which it had been incorporated into since 1978, and the re-establishment of its own tour calendar for the 1982 season. To counter the threat of player leaving the Grand Prix tour for the WCT the MIPTC introduced a mandatory commitment to play at least 10 Grand Prix Super Series tournaments.

Schedule
The table below shows the 1982 Volvo Grand Prix schedule (a precursor to the ATP Tour).

Total prize money amount for all tournaments comes from ATP.

January

February

March

April

May

June

July

August

September

October

November

December

January 1983

Grand Prix standings

1. Jimmy Connors (USA) 3355pts

2. Guillermo Vilas (Arg) 2495

3. Ivan Lendl (Cze) 2313

4. John McEnroe (USA) 2305

5. Mats Wilander (Sue)

6. Vitas Gerulaitis (USA)

7. José Higueras (Spain)

8. Johan Kriek (South Africa)

9. Andrés Gomez (Ecu)

10. Steve Denton (USA)

ATP rankings

*The official ATP year-end rankings were listed from January 3rd, 1983.

List of tournament winners
The list of winners and number of singles titles won, alphabetically by last name:
 John Alexander (2) Bristol, Sydney Outdoor
 Jimmy Arias (1) Tokyo Outdoor
 Mike Bauer (2) Bangkok, Adelaide
 Pat Cash (1) Melbourne (January 1983)
 José Luis Clerc (5) Richmond WCT, Venice, Gstaad, Zell am See, São Paulo
 Jimmy Connors (7) Monterrey, Los Angeles, Las Vegas, Queen's Club, Wimbledon, Columbus, US Open
 Kevin Curren (1) Cologne
 Brad Drewett (1) Cairo
 Pat Du Pré (1) Hong Kong
 Wojciech Fibak (3) Amsterdam WCT, Bercy, Chicago-2 WCT
 Jaime Fillol (2) Bahia, Itaparica
 John Fitzgerald (1) Maui
 Rod Frawley (1) Adelaide-2
 Vitas Gerulaitis (5) Brussels, Florence, Toronto, Melbourne Indoor, Johannesburg
 Brad Gilbert (1) Taiwan
 Hans Gildemeister (1) Bordeaux
 Andrés Gómez (2) Rome, Quito
 Brian Gottfried (2) Tampa, Vienna
 José Higueras (2) Hamburg, Indianapolis
 Erick Iskersky (1) Metz
 Anders Järryd (2) Linz, Ancona
  Johan Kriek (3) Memphis, La Costa WCT, Australian Open
 Ramesh Krishnan (1) Stuttgart Outdoor
 Jay Lapidus (1) Stowe
 Henri Leconte (1) Stockholm
 Ivan Lendl (14) Delray Beach WCT, Genova WCT, Munich-2 WCT, Strasbourg WCT, Frankfurt, Houston, Dallas WCT, Forest Hills WCT, Washington, D.C., North Conway, Cincinnati, Los Angeles-2 WCT, Naples Finals WCT, Hartford
 Mario Martínez (1) Palermo
 Gene Mayer (1) Munich
 Sandy Mayer (1) Cleveland
 John McEnroe (5) Philadelphia, San Francisco, Sydney Indoor, Tokyo Indoor, Wembley
 Paul McNamee (1) Baltimore WCT
 Yannick Noah (3) La Quinta, South Orange, Toulouse
 Manuel Orantes (2) Bournemouth, Basel
 Hank Pfister (1) Newport
 Raúl Ramírez (1) Caracas
 Pedro Rebolledo (1) Viña del Mar
 John Sadri (1) Denver
 Bill Scanlon (1) Zurich WCT
 Tomáš Šmíd (2) Mexico City WCT, Cap d'Adge WCT
 Balázs Taróczy (2) Nice, Hilversum
 Brian Teacher (1) Dortmund
 Guillermo Vilas (7) Buenos Aires, Rotterdam, Milan, Monte Carlo, Madrid, Boston, Kitzbühel
 Mats Wilander (3) French Open, Geneva, Barcelona
 Tim Wilkison (1) Auckland
 Van Winitsky (2) Guarujá, Hilton Head WCT

The following players won their first title in 1982:
 Jimmy Arias Tokyo Outdoor
 Mike Bauer Bangkok
 Pat Cash Melbourne (January 1983)
 Pat Du Pré Hong Kong
 Rod Frawley Adelaide-2
 Brad Gilbert Taiwan
 Erick Iskersky Metz
 Anders Järryd Linz
 Jay Lapidus Stowe
 Henri Leconte Stockholm
 Mats Wilander French Open

See also
 1982 World Championship Tennis
 1982 WTA Tour

References

External links
 ATP 1982 results archive

Further reading

 
Grand Prix tennis circuit seasons
Grand Prix